The West of England Premier League (WEPL) is the top level of competition for recreational club cricket in the West of England and is a designated ECB Premier League.

Since its inception in 1999, the most successful club has been Bath, having won the Premier One title on eleven occasions.  The only other clubs to have won the title on more than one occasion are Frocester (2007, 2014 and 2015) and Taunton St Andrews (2001 and 2009).

Structure
The WEPL covers the counties of Bristol, Somerset, Gloucestershire and Wiltshire, and is the top tier of the pyramid structure of leagues in the area. The league has seven divisions, with the top league, Premier One covering the entire region, and the remainder covering more localised areas. The seven divisions each have ten teams, and are split into three distinct 'tiers':

The structure changed after the 2015 season by eliminating Premier Division Two, so that the winners of the Bristol and Somerset Division and the Gloucestershire and Wiltshire Division are now promoted directly into Premier Division One.

There are four feeder leagues serving the WEPL, each having a direct link with one of the lower divisions as follows:
Bristol and North Somerset - Bristol & District Cricket Association
Somerset - Somerset Cricket League
Gloucestershire - Gloucestershire County Cricket League
Wiltshire - Wiltshire County Cricket League

Winners

1999–2006

2007–2015
In 2007 Gloucestershire/Wiltshire Two was replaced by separate divisions for Gloucestershire and Wiltshire.

2016 to 2019
In 2016 Premier Two was eliminated, and there were now two divisions in the second tier and four divisions in the third tier.

Premier One performance by season from 1999

References

External links
 West of England Premier League website

English domestic cricket competitions
Cricket in Bristol
Cricket in Gloucestershire
Cricket in Somerset
Cricket in Wiltshire
ECB Premier Leagues